Nigeria Institute for Oil Palm Research (NIFOR) is a research center into genetic Improvement, production and processing of oil palm, Raphia, date, coconut, Shea and ornamental palms.

History 
The Nigeria Institute for Oil Palm Research (NIFOR) was established in 1939, after series of West African Agricultural conferences by the then Colonial Department of Agriculture, 1927, 1930, and 1938. A resolution was reached to the effect that research on crops should be regionalized and be carried out in its appropriate territory. The West African Research Organization was created in 1950 and stretched throughout the west coast.

The Nigeria component was renamed Nigeria Institute for Oil Palm Research (NIFOR) by the Research Institute’s Act 33 of 1964. Same year, the institute mandate was expanded to include coconut, raphia, date palm and some skeletal works on coconut mostly to understand the coconut pest and diseases, coconut nutrition.  

In 1967 the problems associated with date palm led to the inclusion of research on date palm in her mandate and by 1970 full operation were kick started.  In 1992, the control of the institute was moved to the Federal Ministry of Agriculture.

References

External links
 Nigeria Institute for Oil Palm Research 

Research institutes in Nigeria
Agricultural research institutes
Agricultural organizations based in Nigeria
Organizations established in 1939
1939 establishments in Africa